Nery Antonio Cardozo Escobar (born 26 May 1989) is a Paraguayan former professional footballer who played as a forward. He has the record of the fastest goal in the history of 104 seasons of football of Asociación Paraguaya de Fútbol in 2011.

Career

Atlético Tembertary
Cardozo was born in Quiindy, Paraguay. In 2005, he formed part of Tembetary's squad as a 16-year-old, along with Jorge Aquino. Both players remained at the club for the following season. In 2007, he appeared for the squad in Paraguay's third-tier league.

Rubio Ñu
In October 2011, Cardozo netted for Rubio Ñu against Olimpia Asunción. In April 2011, Cardozo achieved the record of scoring the fasting goal in 104 seasons of Paraguayan football, scoring against Cerro Porteño in 7 and a fraction seconds.

Viking (loan)
In March 2012, Cardozo impressed well coach Age Hareide in his first friendly game in Norway against Ålesund, only being in the country for 24 hours before it. Cardozo's transfer to Viking FK was a loan deal from Rubio Ñú.

Olimpia Asunción (loan)
In January 2014, Cardozo agreed to a six-month deal with Olimpia Asunción. Chilean Primera División club O'Higgins wanted to sign Cardozo, but he signalled that he wanted to play for Olimpia. His signing to Olimpia was a loan from his owner club Rubio Ñu. Cardozo prepared the 2012 pre-season training with Rubio Ñu, before he was chosen as a signing by Olimpia coach Ever Hugo Almeida. He began very well the first friendlies of the 2014 season with goals. In February 2014, Cardozo received surgery which was a successful operation according to Olimpia's medic, and that the player could return within one month.

Gimnasia LP (loan)
In July 2014, Cardozo left Olimpia to join Gimnasia La Plata. His contract was until December 2015. In January 2015, Cardozo gave his consent to return to Rubio Ñu whilst he was negotiating his departure with Gimnasia La Plata.

Guaraní
In June 2016, Cardozo joined Club Guaraní, becoming their third signing for the Torneo Clausura.

Nacional Asunción
In February 2018, Cardozo signed with Nacional Asunción.

Independiente CG
In 2019, Cardozo formed part of the Independiente CG squad with Victor Mareco and Aldo Paniagua, which played in the Copa Sudamericana, despite bring in the Paraguay División Intermedia.

Honours
Individual
 Fastest goal in the history of 104 seasons of football of Asociación Paraguaya de Fútbol in 2011.

References

External links
 
 
 

1989 births
Living people
Paraguayan footballers
Association football forwards
Paraguayan Primera División players
Argentine Primera División players
Atlético Tembetary footballers
Club Rubio Ñu footballers
Club Olimpia footballers
Viking FK players
Club de Gimnasia y Esgrima La Plata footballers
Club Guaraní players
Club Nacional footballers
Paraguayan expatriate footballers
Paraguayan expatriate sportspeople in Argentina
Expatriate footballers in Argentina
Paraguayan expatriate sportspeople in Norway
Expatriate footballers in Norway